China Resources Land Limited is a property developer of China Resources Group. Its business is the development and management of residential and investment properties in Mainland China major cities including Beijing, Shanghai, Shenzhen, Chengdu, Wuhan and Hefei, Hangzhou, Wuxi, Dalian, Ningbo, Changsha, Suzhou, Chongqing and Shenyang. It was listed on the Hong Kong Stock Exchange as red chip stock in 1996.

Through its subsidiaries, China Resources Land is engaged in property development, investment and management, and construction and decoration services. China Resources Land's residential projects include Oak Bay, Phoenix City Phase 3, Phoenix Plaza, The Bund Side, Jade City, Phoenix City, Wuhan Phoenix City, Hefei French Annecy and Wuxi Taihu International Community.

China in 2003 had 123.4 million hectares of cultivated land, 11.1 million hectares of gardens, 234 million  hectares of forest land, 263.1 million hectares of grassland, 25.5083 million hectares of land for other agricultural uses, 25.3542 million hectares of land for residential, industrial and mining uses, 2.1 million hectares of land for communication and transportation uses and 3.5653 million hectares of land for water conservancy facilities.

See also
Real estate in China

External links
 
China Resources Land Limited

References

Companies listed on the Hong Kong Stock Exchange
Government-owned companies of China
Real estate companies of China
China Resources